Lamana Hotel is a hotel in Waigani, Port Moresby, Papua New Guinea, located near the St John Guise Stadium. The hotel has 60 rooms and is an important conference centre, and has hosted attendments of the 19th Conference of the Pacific Power Association.

References

External links
Official site

Hotels in Papua New Guinea
Buildings and structures in Port Moresby